The Upper Peninsula of Michigan – also known as Upper Michigan or colloquially the U.P. – is the northern and more elevated of the two major landmasses that make up the U.S. state of Michigan; it is separated from the Lower Peninsula by the Straits of Mackinac. It is bounded primarily by Lake Superior to the north, separated from the Canadian province of Ontario at the east end by the St. Marys River, and flanked by Lake Huron and Lake Michigan along much of its south. Although the peninsula extends as a geographic feature into the state of Wisconsin, the state boundary follows the Montreal and Menominee rivers and a line connecting them.

First inhabited by Algonquian-speaking native American tribes, the area was explored by French colonists, then occupied by British forces, before being ceded to the newly established United States in the late 18th century. After being assigned to various territorial jurisdictions, it was granted to the newly formed state of Michigan as part of the settlement of a dispute with Ohio over the city of Toledo. The region's exploitable timber resources and the discovery of iron and copper deposits in the 19th century brought immigrants, especially French Canadian, Finnish, Swedish, Cornish, and Italian. (The peninsula includes the only counties in the United States where a plurality of residents claim Finnish ancestry.) With the exhaustion of readily available minerals, the area's economy declined in the 20th century, largely becoming dependent on logging and tourism.

The Upper Peninsula contains 29% of the land area of Michigan but only 3% of its total population; at the height of the mining and timber era in the early 20th century it had as much as 11% of the state's population. Residents are nicknamed Yoopers (derived from "UP-ers") and have a strong regional identity, enhanced by the perception that the rest of the state neglects them. Proposals have been made to establish the UP as a separate state, but have failed to gain traction. Its largest cities are Marquette, Sault Ste. Marie, Escanaba, Menominee, Houghton, and Iron Mountain. Because of the surrounding waters and northern latitude, it receives more snow than most of the eastern U.S. The heavily forested land, soil types, short growing season, and logistical factors (e.g. long distance to market, lack of infrastructure) make the Upper Peninsula poorly suited for agriculture. The region is home to a variety of wildlife, including moose, wolves, coyotes, deer, foxes, bears, bobcats, eagles, hawks, owls, and smaller animals.

History

The first known inhabitants of the Upper Peninsula were tribes speaking Algonquian languages. They arrived roughly around 800 C.E. and subsisted chiefly from fishing. Early tribes included the Menominee, Odawa, Ojibwa, Nocquet, Potawatomi. Étienne Brûlé of France was probably the first European to visit the peninsula, crossing the St. Marys River around 1620 in search of a route to the Far East.
French colonists laid claim to the land in the 17th century, establishing missions and fur trading posts such as Sault Ste. Marie and St. Ignace. Following the end of the French and Indian War (part of the Seven Years' War) in 1763, the territory was ceded to Great Britain. Sault Ste Marie is the oldest European settlement in Michigan and the site of Native American settlements for centuries.

American Indian tribes formerly allied with the French were dissatisfied with the British occupation, which brought new territorial policies. Whereas the French cultivated alliances among the Indians, the British postwar approach was to treat the tribes as conquered peoples. In 1763, tribes united in Pontiac's Rebellion to try to drive the British from the area. American Indians captured Fort Michilimackinac, at present-day Mackinaw City, then the principal fort of the British in the Michilimackinac region, as well as others and killed hundreds of British. In 1764, they began negotiations with the British, resulting in temporary peace and changes in objectionable British policies.

Although the Upper Peninsula nominally became United States territory with the 1783 Treaty of Paris, the British did not give up control until 1797 under terms of the Jay Treaty. As an American territory, the Upper Peninsula was still dominated by the fur trade. John Jacob Astor founded the American Fur Company on Mackinac Island in 1808; however, the industry began to decline in the 1830s as beaver and other game were overhunted.

When the Michigan Territory was first established in 1805, it included only the Lower Peninsula and the eastern portion of the Upper Peninsula. In 1819, the territory was expanded to include the remainder of the Upper Peninsula, all of what later became Wisconsin, and part of Minnesota (previously included in the Indiana and Illinois Territories). When Michigan applied for statehood in the 1830s, the proposal corresponded to the original territorial boundaries.

However, there was an armed conflict known as the Toledo War with the state of Ohio over the location of their mutual border. Meanwhile, the people of Michigan approved a constitution in May 1835 and elected state officials in late autumn 1835. Although the state government was not yet recognized by the United States Congress, the territorial government effectively ceased to exist. President Andrew Jackson's government offered the remainder of the Upper Peninsula to Michigan if it would cede the Toledo Strip to Ohio. A constitutional convention of the state legislature refused, but a second convention, hastily convened by Governor Stevens Thomson Mason, consisting primarily of his supporters, agreed in December 1836 to the deal. In January 1837, the U.S. Congress admitted Michigan as a state of the Union.

At the time, Michigan was considered the losing party in the compromise. The land in the Upper Peninsula was described in a federal report as a "sterile region on the shores of Lake Superior destined by soil and climate to remain forever a wilderness." This belief changed when rich mineral deposits (primarily copper and iron) were discovered in the 1840s. The Upper Peninsula's mines produced more mineral wealth than the California Gold Rush, especially after shipping was improved by the opening of the Soo Locks in 1855, and docks in Marquette in 1859. The Upper Peninsula supplied 90% of America's copper by the 1860s. It was the largest supplier of iron ore by the 1890s, and production continued to a peak in the 1920s, but sharply declined shortly afterward. The last copper mine closed in 1995, although the majority of mines had closed decades before. Some iron mining continues near Marquette. The Eagle Mine, a nickel-copper mine, opened in 2014.

Thousands of Americans and immigrants moved to the area during the mining boom, prompting the federal government to create Fort Wilkins near Copper Harbor to maintain order. The first wave were the Cornish from Great Britain, with centuries of mining experience; followed by Irish, Germans, and French Canadians. During the 1890s, Finnish immigrants began settling there in large numbers, forming the population plurality in the northwestern half of the peninsula. In the early 20th century, 75% of the population was foreign-born.

From 1861 to 1865, 90,000 Michigan men fought in the American Civil War, including 1,209 from the Upper Peninsula. Houghton County contributed 460 soldiers, while Marquette County, Michigan sent 265.

There was a boundary dispute over the border with Wisconsin. The northwesternmost portion of the border follows a line from Lac Vieux Desert to the headwaters of the Montreal River. An 1847 survey established the east branch of the Montreal River as the border.  However, the 1908 revision of the Constitution of Michigan specified that the west branch of the Montreal River was the proper border, which would have placed an additional 360 square miles of land on the Michigan side of the border.  A 1926 Supreme Court decision awarded this tract of land to Wisconsin.

Geography

The Upper Peninsula contains , about 29 percent of the land area of the state (exclusive of territorial waters, which constitute about 40% of Michigan's total jurisdictional area). It is bounded on the north by Lake Superior, on the east by St. Marys River, on the south by Lake Michigan and Lake Huron, and on the west by Wisconsin and (counting the water border on Lake Superior) by Minnesota.

Michigan's Upper Peninsula is bounded on land by Wisconsin to the southwest and west; and in territorial waters by Minnesota to the west, Ontario to the west, north and east, and the Door Peninsula of Wisconsin extends into Lake Michigan east of the western Upper Peninsula.

Five Michigan Upper Peninsula counties include nearby major islands: Mackinac Island, Round Island and Bois Blanc Island in Lake Huron are in Mackinac County; Sugar Island and Neebish Island in the St. Marys River, and Drummond Island in Lake Huron are in Chippewa County; Grand Island is in Alger County; Summer Island is Delta County; and Isle Royale is part of Keweenaw County.The peninsula is divided between the flat, swampy areas in the east, part of the Great Lakes Plain, and the steeper, more rugged western half, called the Superior Upland, part of the Canadian Shield. The rock in the western portion is the result of volcanic eruptions and is estimated to be at least 3.5 billion years old (much older than the eastern portion) and contains the region's ore resources. Banded-iron formations were deposited 2 billion years ago; this is the Marquette Range Supergroup. A considerable amount of bedrock is visible. Mount Arvon, the highest point in Michigan, is found in the region, as well as the Porcupine and Huron mountains. All of the higher areas are the remnants of ancient peaks, worn down over millions of years by erosion and glaciers.

The Keweenaw Peninsula is the northernmost part of the peninsula (not counting Isle Royale, which is politically part of the UP). It projects into Lake Superior and was the site of the first copper boom in the United States, part of a larger region of the peninsula called the Copper Country. Copper Island is its northernmost section.

About one-third of the peninsula is government-owned recreational forest land today, including the Ottawa National Forest and Hiawatha National Forest. Although heavily logged in the 19th century, the majority of the land was forested with mature trees by the 1970s.

Wildlife
The Upper Peninsula contains a large variety of wildlife. Some of the mammals found in the UP include shrews, moles, mice, white-tailed deer, moose, black bears, cougar, gray and red foxes, wolves, river otters, martens, fishers, muskrats, bobcats, coyotes, snowshoe hares, cotton-tail rabbits, porcupines, chipmunks, squirrels, raccoons, opossum and bats. There is a large variety of birds, including hawks, osprey, owls, gulls, hummingbirds, chickadees, robins (the state bird), woodpeckers, warblers, and bald eagles. In terms of reptiles and amphibians, the UP has common garter snakes, red bellied snakes, pine snakes, northern water snakes, brown snakes, eastern garter snakes, eastern fox snakes, eastern ribbon back snakes, green snakes, northern ringneck snakes, eastern milk snakes (Mackinac and Marquette counties) and eastern hognose snakes (Menominee County only), plus snapping turtles, wood turtles, and painted turtles (the state reptile), green frogs, bullfrogs, northern leopard frogs, and salamanders. Lakes and rivers contain many fish such as walleye, muskie, northern pike, trout, salmon, bullhead catfish, and bass. Invasive species like the alewife and sea lamprey can be found in the Great Lakes. The UP also contains many shellfish, such as clams, aquatic snails, and crayfish. The American Bird Conservancy and the National Audubon Society have designated several locations as internationally Important Bird Areas.

After being nearly extirpated from the conterminous United States, gray wolves survived in the remote northeastern corner of Minnesota and Ontario. The repopulation of wolves in this region has occurred naturally as they have expanded their territory. 

There is significant discussion and studies over the presence of eastern cougars in the UP. Historically, the last of the species, or subspecies, was extirpated near Newberry in 1906, although there have been sightings of the creatures over the years since. These reports increased in number over the first decade of the 21st century. The Michigan Department of Natural Resources and Environment (DNRE) formed a four-person team to investigate sightings in the state. The biologists with the DNRE currently do not believe that there is a breeding population anywhere in the state, rather that the sighted animals are visitors to the state. As late as January 2007, the DNRE's official position was that no cougars lived in Michigan. Several residents in the state disagree with both current and previous positions on the part of the DNRE. Researchers at Central Michigan University and the Michigan Wildlife Conservancy in 2006 published the findings of a study using DNA analysis of fecal samples taken in the Upper and Lower peninsulas that showed the presence of cougars at the time. These results were disputed in a second journal article in 2007 by other researchers from Eastern Michigan University and the U.S. Forest Service. A citizen's group, the Michigan Citizens for Cougar Recognition (MCCR), independently tracked sightings and in 2009 listed Delta County as the location with the greatest number of reports in the state. The DNRE verified five sets of tracks and two trail camera photos in Delta, Chippewa, Marquette, and Menominee counties since 2008. DNRE officials acknowledge that there are cougars in the UP, but not elsewhere in the state. Critics of the DNRE's position on the species, including the founder of the MCCR, say that the department is attempting to "avoid paying for a cougar management program".

There are also many invasive species that are primarily brought in the ballast water of foreign ships, usually from the ocean bordering Northeastern Asia. This water is dumped directly into the Great Lakes, depositing a variety of fresh and salt water fish and invertebrates, most notably the zebra mussel, Dreissena polymorpha. There are also many plant species that have been transported to the Great Lakes, including purple loosestrife, Lythrum salicaria and Phragmites australis, both of which are considered to be a threat to native hydrophyte wetland plants.

The emerald ash borer was first reported in the UP at Brimley State Park, and is considered to be a serious ecological threat to the habitat and economy.

Climate

The Upper Peninsula has a humid continental climate (Dfb in the Köppen climate classification system). The Great Lakes have a great effect on the larger part of the peninsula. Winters tend to be long, cold, and snowy for most of the peninsula, and because of its northern latitude, the daylight hours are short—around 8 hours between sunrise and sunset in the winter. Lake Superior has the greatest effect on the area, especially the northern and western parts.

The Keweenaw Peninsula averages more snowfall than any other location east of the Mississippi River. Because of the howling storms across Lake Superior, which cause dramatic amounts of precipitation, it has been said that the lake-effect snow makes the Keweenaw Peninsula the snowiest place east of the Rockies. Herman averages  of snow every year. Lake-effect snow can cause blinding whiteouts in just minutes, and some storms can last for days. Hancock is found frequently on lists of the snowiest cities in America.

The banana belt along the Wisconsin border has a more continental climate since most of its weather does not arrive from the lakes. Summers tend to be warmer and winter nights much colder. Coastal communities have temperatures tempered by the Great Lakes. In summer, it might be  cooler at lakeside than it is inland, and the opposite effect is seen in winter. The area of the Upper Peninsula north of Green Bay through Menominee and Escanaba (and extending west to Iron River) does not have the extreme weather and precipitation found to the north.

Time zones
Like the entire Lower Peninsula, most of the Upper Peninsula observes Eastern Time. However, the four counties bordering Wisconsin are in the Central Time zone.

In 1967, when the Uniform Time Act came into effect, the Upper Peninsula went under year-round CST, with no daylight saving time. In 1973, the majority of the peninsula switched to Eastern Time; only the four western border counties of Gogebic, Iron, Dickinson, and Menominee continue to observe Central Time. Daylight saving time is observed peninsula-wide.

Government

There are 15 counties in the Upper Peninsula.

State prisons are located in Baraga, Marquette, Munising, Newberry, and Kincheloe.

Politics
Historically, the Upper Peninsula tended to vote for the Democratic Party due to its legacy of mining and historically high union membership. However, as union strength in the peninsula declined, in the 2010s the region has become more leaning towards the Republican Party (though split-ticket voting at the local level became a common practice). In the 2012 presidential election, Republican presidential candidate Mitt Romney carried all but two counties. In the 2016 and 2020 presidential elections, Republican candidate Donald Trump won all counties except Marquette County.

All counties in the UP are part of Michigan's 1st congressional district. Jack Bergman, a Republican, has been the U.S. representative for this district since January 2017.

In Michigan's 2010 gubernatorial election Republican Rick Snyder carried every UP county but one, Gogebic, on his way to victory over his Democratic opponent, Virg Bernero.

Proposed statehood

Due to the geographic separation and perceived cultural and political differences from the Lower Peninsula, at various times there have been proposals for the Upper Peninsula to secede from Michigan as a 51st state named Superior, sometimes including portions of northern Wisconsin and/or the northern Lower Peninsula. Several prominent legislators, including the region's long-serving state representative Dominic Jacobetti, attempted unsuccessfully to gain passage of such a bill in the 1970s. It would be the least populous state in the union, and as stronger connections to the rest of Michigan have developed since completion of the Mackinac Bridge in the 1950s, the proposal has remained largely dormant since the 1970s.

Demographics

The Upper Peninsula remains a predominantly rural region. As of the 2020 census the region had a population of 301,608, just more than 3% of Michigan's total population and a decline of 3.2% from 2010.

According to the 2010 census, 103,211 people live in the 12 towns of at least 4,000 people, covering . A total of 116,548 people live in the 18 towns and villages of at least 2,000 people, which cover —less than 1% of the peninsula's land area.

Federal censuses indicate that the population of the Upper Peninsula grew throughout the 19th century as European settlers moved into the region, then boomed around the turn of the century, and experienced gradual decline overall during most of the 20th century. The decline was uneven, however: the population in the largest cities – Marquette, Sault Ste Marie, and Escanaba – grew somewhat, while smaller cities and non-urban areas have generally declined in population. The six westernmost counties experienced the largest decrease, from a 1920 population of 153,674 to a 2020 population of 79,392. Many ghost towns exist in the region.

A "" indicates an increase in population from the previous census, and a "" indicates a decrease in population from the previous census.

Economy

Industries

The Upper Peninsula is rich in mineral deposits, including iron, copper, nickel, and silver. Small amounts of gold have also been discovered and mined. In the 19th century, mining dominated the economy, and the UP became home to many isolated company towns. For many years, mines in the Keweenaw Peninsula were the world's largest producers of copper (see Copper mining in Michigan). The mines began declining as early as 1913, with most closing temporarily during the Great Depression. Mines reopened during World War II, but almost all quickly closed after the war ended. The last copper mine in the Copper Country was the White Pine mine, which closed in 1995. Marquette County sits along the Marquette Iron Range, which sent out a significant portion of the iron ore mined in the United States for many years.  , Marquette County is home to one remaining iron ore mine and one nickel and copper mine.

From approximately 1870 to 1915, about 32 quarries mined Jacobsville Sandstone in the Upper Peninsula, particularly near Marquette and the community of Jacobsville. The sandstone was used in many buildings, both locally and around the United States.

Since logging of white pine began in the 1880s, timber has been an important industry. Stands of hemlock and hardwood in the western reaches of the forest experienced larger scale selection-cutting beginning in the mid-20th century. Because of the highly seasonal climate and the short growing season, agriculture is limited in the Upper Peninsula, though potatoes, strawberries and a few other small fruits are grown.

Tourism has become the main industry in recent decades. In 2005, ShermanTravel, LLC listed the Upper Peninsula as #10 in its assessment of all travel destinations worldwide. The peninsula has extensive coastline on the Great Lakes, large tracts of state and national forests, cedar swamps, more than 150 waterfalls, and low population densities. Because of the skiing, camping, boating, fishing, snowmobiling, hunting, and hiking opportunities, many Lower Peninsula and Wisconsin families spend their vacations in the UP, and tourists visit from Detroit, Chicago, Grand Rapids, Milwaukee, and other metropolitan areas. The opening of the Mackinac Bridge in 1957 (see below) has made the Upper Peninsula easily accessible to tourists from the Lower Peninsula and southeast of Michigan, and has helped make the UP a year-round tourist destination.

In 2004, microbreweries began opening across the Upper Peninsula; 14 opened by 2014, and 23 by 2019. In 2019, their annual economic impact totaled $346 million. , three of Michigan's fifty largest breweries were in the Upper Peninsula: Keweenaw Brewing Company, Blackrocks Brewery, and the Ore Dock Brewing Company.

Notable attractions

 Adventure Mine
 Agate Falls
 Au Sable Light Station
 Black River National Forest Scenic Byway
 Bond Falls
 Brockway Mountain Drive
 Calumet Theatre
 Calumet Downtown Historic District
 Castle Rock
 Copper Harbor
 Copper Peak, Ironwood Township
 DeYoung Family Zoo
 Fayette Historic State Park
 Fort Mackinac
 Fort Wilkins Historic State Park
 Garlyn Zoo
 Grand Hotel (Mackinac Island)
 Grand Island National Recreation Area
 Grand Sable Dunes
 The Great Lakes Shipwreck Museum
 Iron County Historical Museum Complex – Caspian
 Iron Mountain Iron Mine – Vulcan
 Isle Royale National Park
 The Keystone Bridge- Ramsay, Michigan
 Keweenaw National Historical Park
 Keweenaw Waterway and Portage Lake Lift Bridge
 Kitch-iti-kipi
 Lake Superior
 Lake Superior State University, Lakers
 Laughing Whitefish Falls
 Mackinac Bridge
 Mackinac Island
 Marquette Arts and Culture Center – Marquette
 The Marquette Lighthouse
 Marquette Mountain Ski Resort
 Michigan Iron Industry Museum – Negaunee
 Michigan Technological University
 Mount Bohemia ski center (with the highest vertical drop, in the Midwest)
 Munising Falls
 National Ski Hall of Fame
 Northern Michigan University
 Marquette Ore Dock
 Oswald's Bear Ranch
 Paulding Light
 Pictured Rocks National Lakeshore
 Pine Mountain ski jump in Iron Mountain is one of the largest artificial ski jumps in the world.
 Point Iroquois Lighthouse
 Porcupine Mountains State Park
 Presque Isle Park, Marquette, Michigan
 Quincy Copper Mine offering guided tours
 Seney National Wildlife Refuge
 Ski Brule in Iron River
 The Soo Locks
 Suicide Hill Ski Jump, Ishpeming, Michigan
 Sylvania Wilderness
 Tahquamenon Falls State Park
 Upper Peninsula Children's Museum – Marquette

Casinos
American Indian casinos contribute to the tourist attractions and are popular in the UP. Originally the casinos were simple, one-room affairs. Some of the casinos are now quite elaborate and are being developed as part of resort and conference facilities, including features such as golf courses, pool and spa, dining, and rooms to accommodate guests.
 Bay Mills Resort & Casino – Brimley
 Island Resort & Casino – Harris
 Kewadin Casinos – Christmas; Hessel; Manistique; St. Ignace; Sault Ste. Marie
 Kings Club Casino – Brimley
 Lac Vieux Desert Casino – Watersmeet
 Ojibwa Casinos – Baraga; Marquette

Transportation

The Upper Peninsula is separated from the Lower by the Straits of Mackinac,  five miles (8 km) across at the narrowest, and is connected to it by the Mackinac Bridge at St. Ignace, one of the longest suspension bridges in the world. Until the bridge was completed in 1957, travel between the two peninsulas was difficult and slow (and sometimes even impossible during winter). In 1881, the Mackinac Transportation Company was established by three railroads, the Michigan Central Railroad, the Grand Rapids and Indiana Railroad, and the Detroit, Mackinac and Marquette Railroad, to operate a railroad car ferry across the Straits. Beginning in 1923, the State of Michigan operated automobile ferries between the two peninsulas. At the busiest times of year the wait was several hours long, much longer at holidays. In winter, travel was possible over the ice only after the straits had solidly frozen.

Highways
There are one Interstate Highway, five US Highways and 24 other state highways in the Upper Peninsula. Interstate 75  is the only freeway in the region and runs from the Mackinac Bridge at St. Ignace to the International Bridge at Sault Ste. Marie. Two highways run the east–west length of the peninsula, US Highway 2 along the south and M-28 to the north. US 41 runs north–south through the central and western UP, connecting Menominee, Escanaba, Marquette and Houghton before terminating near the tip of the Keweenaw at Copper Harbor. M-185 encircles Mackinac Island as the only state highway in the country without motor vehicles.

The United States Forest Service and Federal Highway Administration have designated certain roads within the several National Forests in the UP as Federal Forest Highways. State-maintained highways closest to the Upper Peninsula's Great Lakes shorelines are marked by the Michigan Department of Transportation (MDOT) with signs indicating that they are part of the Great Lakes Circle Tour, a designated scenic road system connecting all of the Great Lakes and the St. Lawrence River. MDOT has also designated five UP highways as Pure Michigan Byways for their historic, recreational or scenic qualities. They are: US 2 in Iron County (Iron County Heritage Trail) and in Schoolcraft and Mackinac counties (Top of the Lake Scenic Byway), US 41 from Houghton to Copper Harbor (Copper County Trail, also a National Scenic Byway), M-35 (UP Hidden Coast Recreational Heritage Trail), M-123 (Tahquamenon Scenic Heritage Route) and M-134 (M-134 North Huron Byway)

Airports

There are 43 airports in the Upper Peninsula. Of these, six airports have commercial passenger service: Gogebic-Iron County Airport north of Ironwood, Houghton County Memorial Airport southwest of Calumet, Ford Airport west of Iron Mountain, Sawyer International Airport south of Marquette, Delta County Airport in Escanaba, and Chippewa County International Airport south of Sault Ste. Marie. There are 19 other public use airports with a hard surface runway. These are used for general aviation and charter. Notably, Mackinac Island, Beaver Island, and Drummond Island are all accessible by airports. There are five public access airports with turf runways and thirteen airports for the private use of their owners. There is only one control tower in the Upper Peninsula, at Sawyer.

Ferries and bridges 

The Eastern Upper Peninsula Transportation Authority operates car ferries in its area. These include ferries for Sugar Island, Neebish Island, and Drummond Island. Two ferry companies run passenger ferries from St. Ignace to Mackinac Island.

The three major bridges in the Upper Peninsula are:
 Mackinac Bridge, connecting the Lower Peninsula of Michigan with the Upper;
 Sault Ste. Marie International Bridge, which connects the city of Sault Ste. Marie to its twin city of Sault Ste. Marie in Canada; and
 Portage Lift Bridge, which crosses Portage Lake. The Portage Lift Bridge is the world's heaviest and widest double-decked vertical lift bridge. Since rail traffic was discontinued in the Keweenaw, the lower deck is used to accommodate snowmobile traffic in the winter. As the only land-based link between the north and south sections of the Keweenaw Peninsula, the bridge is crucial to transportation.

Railways
 Lake Superior and Ishpeming Railroad: Transports iron ore over a  line from the Empire-Tilden Mine (operated by Cleveland-Cliffs Inc.), south of Ishpeming and Negaunee, to Marquette's port on Lake Superior.
 Two railroads originally crossed the Upper Peninsula east to west: the Minneapolis, St. Paul and Sault Ste. Marie Railway, informally known as the Soo Line, running west from Sault Ste. Marie roughly along the Lake Michigan shore, and the Duluth, South Shore and Atlantic Railroad running west from St. Ignace roughly along the Lake Superior shore. In 1960, both railroads were merged into the Soo Line Railroad, the U.S. arm of the Canadian Pacific Railway. The Soo Line trackage in the Upper Peninsula was purchased by the Wisconsin Central Railroad in 1987. In 1997, the Wisconsin Central also purchased from the Union Pacific Railroad the former Chicago and North Western Railway line running into the Upper Peninsula from Wisconsin. The Wisconsin Central was in turn purchased by the Canadian National Railway in 2001. The Canadian National now operates much of the remaining railroad trackage in the Upper Peninsula.

Bus systems
Despite its rural character, there are public buses in several counties of the Upper Peninsula.

Education
The Upper Peninsula of Michigan has three state universities (Lake Superior State University in Sault Ste. Marie, Michigan Technological University in Houghton, and Northern Michigan University in Marquette), one private university (Finlandia University located in Hancock, Michigan, on the Keweenaw Peninsula), and five community colleges (Bay Mills Community College in Brimley, Bay de Noc Community College in Escanaba and Iron Mountain, Gogebic Community College in Ironwood, and Keweenaw Bay Ojibwa Community College in Baraga).

Culture

Early settlers included multiple waves of people from Nordic countries, and people of Finnish ancestry make up 16% of the peninsula's population; the UP is home to the highest concentration of Finns outside Europe and the only counties of the United States where a plurality of residents claim Finnish ancestry. The Finnish sauna and the concept of sisu have been adopted widely by residents of the Upper Peninsula. The television program Finland Calling was for a long period the only Finnish-language television broadcast in the United States; it aired on Marquette station WLUC-TV from March 25, 1962, until March 29, 2015. Finlandia University, America's only college with Finnish roots, is located in Hancock. Street signs in Hancock appear in English and Finnish to celebrate this heritage.

Other sizable ethnic communities in the Upper Peninsula include French-Canadian, German, Cornish, Italian, and Ojibwe ancestry.

Upper Peninsula natives speak a dialect influenced by Scandinavian and French-Canadian speech. A popular bumper sticker, a parody of the "Say YES to Michigan" slogan promoted by state tourism officials, shows an outline of the Upper Peninsula and the slogan, "Say ya to da UP, eh!" The dialect and culture are captured in many songs by Da Yoopers, a comedy music and skit troupe from Ishpeming, Michigan.

Throughout the Upper Peninsula, there are newspapers, such as The Daily News in Iron Mountain, The Menominee County Journal in Stephenson, The Daily Mining Gazette in Houghton, The Daily Press in Escanaba, and the Sault Ste. Marie Evening News that serve the rest of the UP The Mining Journal, based in Marquette, is the only daily newspaper that publishes a Sunday edition, which is distributed, with the exception of Chippewa and eastern Mackinac counties, across the entire UP (the other six days are distributed in its local area only).

The Keweenaw Peninsula is home to several ski areas. Mont Ripley, just outside Houghton, is popular among students of Michigan Technological University (the university actually owns the mountain). Further up the peninsula in the small town of Lac La Belle is Mt. Bohemia. A skiing purist's resort, Bohemia is a self-proclaimed "experts only" mountain, and it does not groom its heavily gladed slopes. Other ski areas are Pine Mountain located in Iron Mountain,  Norway Mountain in the town of the same name, and the Porcupine Mountains located in Ontonagon.

Houghton is where professional ice hockey was first started in 1904.

Regional identity

Today, the western Upper Peninsula is home to about 173,887 people, while the eastern Upper Peninsula is home to about 133,499 people, a total of 307,386—only about 3% of the state's population—living in almost one-third of the state's land area. Residents are known as Yoopers (from "UP-ers"), and many consider themselves Yoopers before they consider themselves Michiganders. (People living in the Lower Peninsula are commonly called "trolls" by Upper Peninsula residents, as they live "Under the Bridge".) This regionalism is not only a result of the physical separation of the two peninsulas, but also the history of the state.

Residents of the western Upper Peninsula take on some of the cultural identities of both Wisconsin and Michigan. In terms of sports fandom, residents may support Detroit professional teams or those of Wisconsin—particularly the Green Bay Packers. This is a result of both proximity and the broadcast and print media of the area. The four counties that border Wisconsin are also in the Central Time Zone, unlike the rest of Michigan, which is on Eastern time.  In some cases, commercial cartographers draw incorrect maps that inadvertently annex the Upper Peninsula into Wisconsin.

Cuisine
The Upper Peninsula has a distinctive local cuisine. The pasty (pronounced "pass-tee"), a kind of meat turnover originally brought to the region by Cornish miners, is popular among locals and tourists alike. Pasty varieties include chicken, venison, pork, hamburger, and pizza, all of which many restaurants serve.
Many restaurants serve potato sausage and cudighi, a spicy Italian meat.

Finnish immigrants contributed nisu, a cardamom-flavored sweet bread; limppu, an Eastern Finnish rye bread; pannukakku, a variant on the pancake with a custard flavor; viili (sometimes spelled "fellia"), a stretchy, fermented Finnish milk; and korppu, hard slices of toasted cinnamon bread, traditionally dipped in coffee. Some Finnish foods such as juusto (squeaky cheese, essentially a cheese curd, like Leipäjuusto) and saunamakkara (a ring-bologna sausage) have become so ubiquitous in Upper Peninsula cuisine that they are now commonly found in most grocery stores and supermarkets.

Maple syrup is a highly prized local delicacy. Fresh Great Lakes fish, such as the lake trout, whitefish, and (in the spring) smelt are widely eaten. There is minimal concern about contamination of fish from Lake Superior waters. Smoked fish is also popular. Thimbleberry jam and chokecherry jelly are a treat.

Notable people

 Robert J. Flaherty, the filmmaker who directed and produced the documentary Nanook of the North, in 1922, from Iron Mountain.
 George Gipp, the "Gipper"—immortalized in the film Knute Rockne, All American—was born in Laurium. He was the first All-American player of the Notre Dame football program.
 Crystal Hayes, 2005 Miss Michigan, from Rock.
 Tom Izzo, Michigan State basketball coach a native of Iron Mountain, attended Northern Michigan University.
 Clarence L. "Kelly" Johnson, aircraft engineer and aeronautical innovator, was born in Ishpeming.
 John Lautner, one of Frank Lloyd Wright's most successful Taliesin fellows, a native of Marquette and alumnus of NMU. 
 Mitchell Leisen, film director, was born Menominee in 1898.
 Steve Mariucci, former San Francisco 49ers and Detroit Lions head coach; a native of Iron Mountain, attended Northern Michigan University.
 Terry O'Quinn, actor on Lost, was born in Sault Ste. Marie in 1952 and grew up in Newberry.
 Chase Osborn was the only Governor of Michigan from the Upper Peninsula (1911–1913).
 Pam Reed, ultrarunner, grew up in Palmer, and graduated from Michigan Technological University.
 Gene Ronzani was a professional football running back for the Chicago Bears and head coach of the Green Bay Packers from 1950 to 1953; born in Iron Mountain.
 Rob Rubick, Detroit Lions tight end and current Fox Sports Detroit analyst, from Newberry.
 Glenn T. Seaborg, a Nobel Prize-winning chemist and major contributor in the discovery of several of the transuranium elements, was born in Ishpeming.
 Howard Schultz, chairman of Starbucks Co., a Northern Michigan University alumnus.
 Mike Shaw, professional wrestler, was born in Skandia. 
 Matthew Songer, founder of Pioneer Surgical Technology, lives in Marquette.
 Mary Chase Perry Stratton, founder of Pewabic Pottery, was born in Hancock.
 Lou Thesz, professional wrestler who held the NWA World Heavyweight Championship longer than anyone in history, was born in Banat, on April 24, 1916.
 James Tolkan, an actor who appeared in Back to the Future and Top Gun, born in Calumet. 
 John D. Voelker, Justice of the Michigan Supreme Court, wrote the best-selling book Anatomy of a Murder under the pen name Robert Traver. Directed by Otto Preminger, the film was shot in Big Bay and Ishpeming with some courtroom scenes in Marquette.
 Bill Ivey, the former head of the National Endowment for the Arts under the Clinton Administration was born in Calumet.
 Nick Baumgartner, Olympic gold medalist in mixed snowboard cross at the 2022 Winter Olympics, is from Iron River.

See also

 List of counties in Michigan
 Heikki Lunta, mythological character
 Stormy Kromer cap

Notes

References

Further reading

 
  113 pages.
 
  376 pages.
  270 pages.

External links

 Upper Peninsula of Michigan Travel
 Western Upper Peninsula of Michigan

 
Regions of Michigan